Chinácota is a small town and municipality located in the Department  of Norte de Santander in Colombia, South America. This department is located in the north-eastern region of the country, near the border with Venezuela. Chinácota has a population of approximately 15,000 people (town plus surroundings) according to the 2005 Colombian census.

The municipality of Chinácota extends over 167 square kilometers and is located at an approximate altitude of 1,175 meters over the sea level. The average temperature range is between 12 and 22 degrees Celsius.

The urban area of Chinácota comprises about 29 neighborhoods and includes a residential count of approximately 2,600 houses.  Chinácota was expected to grow by about 66% by 2011.

History

Chinacota was founded in 1553 by the conquistador Pedro de Orsua and Ortun Velasco. When the conquistador Don Pedro de Ursua and her partner Don Ortun Velazco were entrusted to reduce Indians Bocarema, Chinaquillo, Bochaga and Bateca who in turn founded some populations, among them that of St. John the Baptist in today site called " Pueblo - straw " belonging to the nation of the chitareros, the name given by the Spaniards to the natives of the valleys of Bochalema, Chinácota and the Holy Spirit because" their entertainment and other revelries of the executed with chicaras totumo (chítaro in single speech) reeds and other primitive tools.

Notable people
Jhoan Arenas (born 1990), footballer
Campo Elías Delgado (1934-1986), spree killer
Biofilo Panclasta (1879-1943), activist

References

External links
   Chinácota official website
   UfpsChinácota official website
   Social Network UfpsChinácota website

Municipalities of the Norte de Santander Department
Populated places established in 1523